Wayne Gaffney McLeland (August 29, 1924 – May 9, 2004) was an American professional baseball player, a right-handed pitcher whose 11-year (1942; 1946–1955) pro career included ten games played in Major League Baseball for the 1951–1952 Detroit Tigers. McLeland was a veteran of the United States Army, serving during World War II.

Originally signed by the St. Louis Cardinals after his 1940 graduation from Stockport High School, McLeland was named the 1950 "pitcher of the year" in the Double-A Texas League, as he won 21 of 29 decisions and  compiled an earned run average of 2.49 in 267 innings pitched for the unaffiliated Dallas Eagles franchise. He was acquired by the Tigers after that season and spent most of the 1951 and 1952 campaigns at the Triple-A level of minor league baseball, with three brief trials with the Tigers. In his only starting role in MLB, against the Chicago White Sox on September 9, 1951, he allowed four earned runs in  innings and took the loss in a 4–3 defeat. White Sox first baseman Eddie Robinson drove in three runs with a home run and a double, to do most of the damage against McLeland that day.

During his brief Major League service, McLeland allowed 24 hits, 13 runs (all earned), and ten bases on balls in  total innings of work; he failed to record a strikeout. He settled in Houston, Texas, after his baseball career ended and spent 35 years working for the Goodyear Tire and Rubber Company.

References

External links

1924 births
2004 deaths
Baseball players from Iowa
Buffalo Bisons (minor league) players
Columbus Red Birds players
Dallas Eagles players
Detroit Tigers players
Duluth Dukes players
Houston Buffaloes players
Major League Baseball pitchers
Oklahoma City Indians players
Baseball players from Houston
People from Van Buren County, Iowa
Rochester Red Wings players
Shreveport Sports players
Toledo Mud Hens players
United States Army personnel of World War II